Fallout: Brotherhood of Steel is an action role-playing game developed and published by Interplay Entertainment, and distributed in Europe by Avalon Interactive for the Xbox and PlayStation 2. Released on January 14, 2004, Fallout: Brotherhood of Steel was the fourth video game to be set in the Fallout universe. It was also the first to be made for consoles, and the last to be made during Interplay's initial run on the series, before the rights passed to Bethesda Softworks. The game chronicles the adventures of an initiate in the fictional Brotherhood of Steel, a militant quasi-religious organization that has come to power in a post-apocalyptic world.

Bethesda Softworks has declared the game to be non-canon to the greater Fallout series.

Gameplay 
As a spinoff, Brotherhood of Steels gameplay greatly differs from that of other Fallout games. The gameplay is linear, not open-world. Instead of being able to travel freely across a broad world full of places and events as in other Fallout games, the player is confined to one location at a time. Previously visited locations cannot be visited again, and new locations can only be discovered by advancing the story. There are 50 distinct zones of varying size in Brotherhood of Steel.

Brotherhood of Steel uses many of the same mechanics as other entries in the Fallout series, including the SPECIAL (Strength, Perception, Endurance, Charisma, Intelligence, Agility, Luck) attribute assignment system. These seven attributes are assigned numeric values and govern most interactions in the game. Unlike other Fallout games, however, the values are constant for each character rather than customizable.
 
Skills exist in this game, but they do not behave like skills in other Fallout games. Rather, they are analogous to perks. When the player levels up, they receive "skill points" to increase the power of skills. Some skills also have level restrictions.

 Playable characters 
The player chooses one of up to six playable characters to control as the PC. There are no party members, but a co-op mode is available. The last three characters on the list are unlockable. The player meets them within the story, and they only become available to control after completing specific chapters in the game.

 Cyrus grew up fighting off raiders in a community of tribal farmers. When the community was devastated by the Super Mutant army, he wandered the post-apocalyptic wastelands. In time, he heard about the Brotherhood of Steel's opposition of the mutant army, and chose to join them. He can use heavy weapons, and can maneuver with them better than the other playable characters. However, he cannot run while firing.
 Cain was born a human, but became a ghoul after exposure to radiation poisoning from the apocalypse. He controlled the City of the Dead, Necropolis, until its destruction at the hands of the Super Mutant army. Cain joined the Brotherhood of Steel to seek vengeance for his city. He can use all heavy weapons, but is unable to run while firing them. Unlike Cyrus, he can also use dual pistols.
 Nadia grew up in a ravaged urban area as an orphan, stealing to keep herself fed and clothed. She is the archetypical rogue, relying on cunning and light fingers to keep herself alive. She became aware of the Brotherhood of Steel one day when they came to her town, providing food and cleaning up for the residents. She joined the Brotherhood soon after that. She can use dual pistols and can run while firing, but lacks the ability to use heavy weapons.
 Patty was the leader of those who survived in the Garden area. After the player fights the leader of the Super Mutant army, she provides them with medical assistance. She then masterminded a plot for her people to escape to the wastes, but she herself stayed behind to destroy the Vault-Tec research, sacrificing herself in the process. As a playable character, she is most similar to Nadia in that she can use dual weapons, but not heavy weapons.
 Rhombus was a Paladin who led a separatist faction of the Brotherhood of Steel. This faction tracked and engaged directly with the Super Mutant army. He was captured by the army and tortured, but would later be saved by the player, only to be wounded by a suicide bomber shortly afterward. His fate is unknown, but he is presumed dead. As a playable character, he is most similar to Cyrus, but has the ability to use all weapon types except dual wield.
 The Vault Dweller''' is the protagonist from the original Fallout. He is a powerful player character, and can only be selected by starting a new game after completing the chapter in which the player meets him. He has the ability to use all weapon types.

 Plot 

Immediately prior to Brotherhood of Steel, the three playable characters (Cain, Cyrus, and Nadia) have joined the Brotherhood as new Initiates. After selecting which character to play as (hereafter referred to as the Initiate), the game opens with the Initiate searching for missing Paladins in the nearby town of Carbon. Minor investigation leads the Initiate to question the Mayor of the town, who demands the destruction of a radscorpion lair before he will reveal any information.  Also, the Initiate gains the trust of Jesse, a trader, and Vidaya, the town doctor. Once the radscorpions are defeated, the Mayor informs the Initiate of the direction the paladins were last known to be traveling.  The Initiate goes into the Crater near the town to find the Paladins.  Unfortunately, the Mayor reveals himself shortly afterward to be a treacherous man and attempts to murder the Initiate using explosives. However, he only succeeds in causing a rock slide and killing himself. Blocked by the rocks, the Initiate heads back to Carbon to find it being looted by raiders, who must then be defeated. The townsfolk have holed up in the warehouse while the Initiate rescues others who didn't make it to the warehouse.  When that is done, the Raider lair is discovered to be the nearby former steel mill.  The Initiate (with some inventory help from Jesse) goes in and defeats the Raider Matron.  While here, the Initiate meets up with the Vault Dweller (the protagonist from the original game) and get directed to look for the Paladin Rhombus in the ghoul town of Los (formerly the outskirts of Los Ybanez).

The Initiate leaves for the town of Los, they meet up with Harold and many of the ghouls in the town. Paladins from a separatist faction of the Brotherhood formed a cult known as the Church of the Lost. The leader of the separatist faction, Rhombus, accompanies the Initiate on a quest to kill Blake, the leader of the cult.  The Initiate moves around the town of Los killing mutants who are following Blake, and meets up with some ghoul brothers that are competing merchants. Along the way, Rhombus is captured, and the Initiate frees him after killing Blake.  The Initiate discovers a key on the cult leader's body. In their haste to escape, however, Rhombus is mortally wounded by kamikaze ghouls and the Initiate must go on without him. Inquiring around the city, the Initiate learns of a nearby vault that may be held by the Super Mutant army, under the direction of Attis.

The Initiate goes to the vault, but is found by the mutant general Attis.  After a brief fight, Attis severs the left arm of the Initiate and dumps him in some ruins of the vault.  Having been left for dead, the Initiate is discovered and assisted by Patty some time later. After regaining the use of the left arm again, the Initiate helps the residents of the vault to evacuate.  The Initiate goes deep into the computer core of the vault to open the AUX AC ducts so the residents can escape.  The Initiate goes back into the Ruins to find the Laboratory passkey to find Attis.  After retrieving the passkey, the Initiate finds that the Super Mutant army has found the Garden area where the residents were hiding and started massacring them all.  One of the residents sacrifices himself to give the residents time to escape.  After clearing out the Mutants in the Garden, the Initiate heads down into the Laboratory.  Attis went there to find a "cure" of sorts, because of the FEV (Forced Evolutionary Virus), the Mutants are sterile.  While the Initiate was searching for Attis, Patty followed him and got caught when Attis exploded.  During the climactic battle, Patty is caught by the blob, and it begins to consume her from the inside. The Initiate, before being caught by Attis as well, is able to start a self-destruct sequence for the vault and quickly performs a mercy killing on Patty before escaping the ensuing destruction via monorail.

 Development 
Interplay built Brotherhood of Steel with the Snowblind game engine previously used in the console games Baldur's Gate: Dark Alliance and the online-capable PS2 game Champions of Norrath.BoS XBox review Gamechronicles Dolby Digital and 480p formats are supported. The soundtrack contains song instrumentals from various heavy metal groups such as Slipknot and Killswitch Engage.

 Reception Brotherhood of Steel has mixed reviews according to review aggregator Metacritic. It received a 7.3/10 from GameSpot and a 7.5/10 from IGN, but only a 3/10 from Eurogamer. Some common themes among these reviews are criticism for the amount of swearing ("Brotherhood of Steel trades Fallout's visceral feel for a lot of four-letter words." -IGN) and repetitive gameplay ("repetitive drawn out maze-like levels [don't do] the game any favours." -Eurogamer). Whilst noting the "incessant" profanity and "very repetitive" gameplay, GameSpot nevertheless considered the game to be "entertaining to play" although not great.

Sequel
A sequel to Fallout: Brotherhood of Steel was planned. Like its predecessor, the game would have used the Dark Alliance Engine, and like other Fallout games, the game would have used a reputation system, only simpler. The game would have featured fourteen new weapons and ten new enemies. Depending on whether the player is good or evil, the game would have played out differently. Each of the four characters that were playable would have had a different fighting style, therefore each time the player played the game, they would have a different experience. It would have had two-player co-op action for players to experience the game with their friends. The Dark Alliance Engine would have been fleshed out and player experience would have been refined. A brand new sneak system would have been added to the game. This system would have allowed players to stealthily follow enemies or use a sniper rifle on them. For characters that could not use the sniper rifle, Interplay added a turret mode allowing those characters to use turrets.

Originally targeted for a fourth-quarter release in 2004, the sequel was canceled due to the poor sales of the first game. The development of the game started before the completion of the original, and its development caused the cancellation of Black Isle Studios' Fallout 3''.

References

External links 
 
 

Role-playing video games
Action role-playing video games
Fallout (series) video games
PlayStation 2 games
Video games featuring black protagonists
Video games featuring female protagonists
Video games set in Texas
Video games set in the United States
Video games set in the 23rd century
Xbox games
2004 video games
Interplay Entertainment games
Multiplayer and single-player video games
Video games developed in the United States
Video games about cults